The Mir mine ( kimberlitovaya almaznaya trubka "Mir"; English: kimberlite diamond pipe "Peace"), also called the Mirny mine, is an open pit diamond mine located in Mirny, Sakha Republic, in the Siberian region of eastern Russia. The mine is more than 525 meters (1,722 ft) deep (4th in the world), has a diameter of 1,200 m (3,900 ft), and is one of the largest excavated holes in the world.

Open-pit mining began in 1957 and was discontinued in 2001. Since 2009, it has been active as an underground diamond mine.

Discovery 
The diamond-bearing deposits were discovered on June 13, 1955, by Soviet geologists Yuri Khabardin, Ekaterina Elagina and Viktor Avdeenko during the large Amakinsky Expedition in Yakut ASSR. They found traces of the volcanic rock kimberlite, which is usually associated with diamonds. This finding was the second success in the search for kimberlite in Russia, after numerous failed expeditions of the 1940s and 1950s. (The first was Zarnitsa mine, 1954.) For this discovery, in 1957, Khabardin was given the Lenin Prize, one of the highest awards in the Soviet Union.

Development 
The development of the mine started in 1957, in extremely harsh climate conditions. Seven months of winter per year froze the ground, making it hard to mine. During the brief summer months, the ground turned to slush. Buildings had to be raised on piles, so that they would not sink from their warmth melting the permafrost. The winter temperatures were so low that car tires and steel would shatter and oil would freeze. During the winter, workers used jet engines to thaw and dig out the permafrost or blasted it with dynamite to get access to the underlying kimberlite. The entire mine had to be covered at night to prevent the machinery from freezing.

In the 1960s, the mine was producing  of diamond per year, of which a relatively high fraction (20%) were of gem quality. The mine operation was interrupted in the 1990s at a depth of  after the pit bottom became flooded, but resumed later.

Operations
The Mir mine was the first developed and the largest diamond mine in the Soviet Union. Its surface operation lasted 44 years, finally closing in June 2001. After the collapse of the USSR in the 1990s, the mine was operated by the Sakha diamond company, which reported annual profits in excess of $600 million from diamond sales.

Later, the mine was operated by Alrosa, the largest diamond producing company in Russia, and employed 3,600 workers. It had long been anticipated that the recovery of diamonds by conventional surface mining would end. Therefore, in the 1970s, construction of a network of tunnels for underground diamond recovery began. By 1999, the project operated exclusively as an underground mine. Production ceased in 2001, and the Mir mine closed in 2004.

The mine was recommissioned in 2009, and is expected to remain operational for 50 more years. The underground Mir mine flooded again in 2017, trapping over 140 miners, all but 8 of whom were rescued.

See also

Udachnaya pipe

References

External links

 Mirny Diamond Mine at Atlas Obscura
 United States Mine Rescue Association 
 BBC News Photo journal: "Postcards from Russia"
 "A Face of Mirny"* Aerial view of the Mirny Diamond Mine from Airliners.net
 A Guided Excursion around the Mirny Sights
 Biggest Diamond Mines

Diamond mines in Russia
Diamond mines in the Soviet Union
Diatremes of Russia
Economy of Siberia
Open-pit mines
Science and technology in the Soviet Union
Surface mines in Russia